Julio Leon may refer to:

 Julio César de León (born 1979), Honduran footballer
 Julio León (politician) (born 1966), Venezuelan politician, governor of Yaracuy
 Julio César León (born 1925), Venezuelan cyclist